Tamang (Devanagari: तामाङ; tāmāng) is a term used to collectively refer to a dialect cluster spoken mainly in Nepal, Sikkim, West Bengal (Darjeeling) and North-Eastern India. It comprises Eastern Tamang, Northwestern Tamang, Southwestern Tamang, Eastern Gorkha Tamang, and Western Tamang. Lexical similarity between Eastern Tamang (which is regarded as the most prominent) and other Tamang languages varies between 81% to 63%. For comparison, lexical similarity between Spanish and Portuguese, is estimated at 89%.

Dialects
Ethnologue divides Tamang into the following varieties due to mutual unintelligibility.
Eastern Tamang: 759,000 in Nepal (2000 WCD). Population total all countries: 773,000. Sub-dialects are as follows.
Outer-Eastern Tamang (Sailung Tamang)
Central-Eastern Tamang (Temal Tamang)
Southwestern Tamang (Kath-Bhotiya, Lama Bhote, Murmi, Rongba, Sain, Tamang Gyoi, Tamang Gyot, Tamang Lengmo, Tamang Tam)
Western Tamang: 323,000 (2000 WCD). Sub-dialects are as follows.
Trisuli (Nuwakot)
Rasuwa
Northwestern dialect of Western Tamang (Dhading) — was having separate ISO code tmk, merged with tdg in 2023. Population 55,000 (1991 census). Spoken in the central mountainous strip of Nuwakot District, Bagmati Province.
Southwestern dialect of Western Tamang
Eastern Gorkha Tamang: 4,000 (2000 WCD). Sub-dialects are as follows.
Kasigaon
Kerounja

The Tamang language is the most widely spoken Sino-Tibetan language in Nepal.

Geographical distribution
Ethnologue gives the following location information for the varieties of Tamang.

Eastern Tamang
Bagmati Province: Bhaktapur District, Chitwan District, Dolkha District, Kathmandu District, Kavrepalanchok District, Lalitpur District, Makwanpur District, eastern Nuwakot District, Ramechhap District, Sindhuli District and western Sindhupalchowk District 
Province No. 1: Okhaldhunga District, western Khotang District, and Udayapur District

Southwestern Tamang
Bagmati Province: Chitwan District, southern Dhading District, western and northwestern Kathmandu District area and northwestern Makwanpur District
Province No. 2: Bara District, Parsa District and Rautahat District

Western Tamang
Bagmati Province: western Nuwakot District, Rasuwa District, and Dhading District
central mountainous strip of Nuwakot District, Bagmati Province (Northwestern Tamang)
northeastern Sindhupalchok District, Bagmati Province: Bhote Namlan, and Bhote Chaur, on Trishuli river west bank toward Budhi Gandaki river
northwestern Makwanpur District, Bagmati Province: Phakel, Chakhel, Khulekhani, Markhu, Tistung, and Palung
northern Kathmandu District, Bagmati Province: Jhor, Thoka, and Gagal Phedi

Eastern Tamang
south and east of Jagat, northern Gorkha District, Gandaki Province

Grammar 
Some grammatical features of the Tamang languages include:
A canonical word order of SOV
Use of postpositions;
The genitives follow nouns;
question word medial;
It is an ergative–absolutive language;
CV, CVC, CCV, V, CCVC;

Phonetically Tamang languages are tonal.

Phonology

Consonants

Vowels 

Nasality only marginally occurs, and is typically transcribed with a  mark.

Tones 
Four tones occur as high falling , mid-high level , mid-low level , very low .

Writing system 
Tamang language is written in Tamyig script.

References

Bibliography
 Perumal Samy P. (2013). Tamang in LSI Sikkim, volume I Page Nos. 404–472. Published by Office of the Registrar General & Census Commissioner,India, Ministry of Home Affairs, Government of India.

External links

Counting in Tamang
ELAR archive of Tamang 

Languages of Nepal
Tamangic languages
Languages of Sikkim
Languages of Bhutan
Subject–object–verb languages
Languages of Bagmati Province
Languages of Koshi Province
Languages of Madhesh Province
Languages of Gandaki Province